Birch Acres is a suburb of Kempton Park, in Gauteng province, South Africa.

References

Suburbs of Kempton Park, Gauteng